Grevillea rhyolitica, commonly known as Deua grevillea or Deua flame, is a species of flowering plant in the family Proteaceae and is endemic to south-eastern New South Wales. It is a more or less erect shrub with elliptic leaves and hairy red flowers.

Description

Taxonomy
Grevillea rhyolitica was first formally described in 1997 by Robert Owen Makinson in the journal Telopea from specimens collected in 1990 by David Albrecht. The specific epithet (rhyolitica) refers to the usual occurrence of this species on outcrops of rhyolite rock.

In 2000, Makinson described two subspecies of G. rhyolitica in the Flora of Australia, and the names are accepted by the Australian Plant Census:
 Grevillea rhyolitica Makinson subsp. rhyolitica has leaves with raised hairs on the lower surface.
 Grevillea rhyolitica subsp. semivestita Makinson has leaves with scattered hairs pressed against the lower surface.

Distribution and habitat
Subspecies rhyolitica of Deua grevillea grows in moist gullies and in steep rocky ridges on rhyolite in montane areas west and south-west of Moruya and subspecies semivestita grows forest in broken escarpment country north-west of Moruya in south-eastern New South Wales.

References

rhyolitica
Flora of New South Wales
Proteales of Australia
Taxa named by Robert Owen Makinson
Plants described in 1997